La Reforma Airport is a rural airstrip  east of Talca, in the Maule Region of Chile.

There are nearby hills to the northwest, and distant hills to the southeast.

See also

Transport in Chile
List of airports in Chile

References

External links
OpenStreetMap - La Reforma
OurAirports - La Reforma
FallingRain - La Reforma Airport

Airports in Maule Region